Pietro Giacomo Nonis (24 April 1927 – 15 July 2014) was a Catholic bishop.

Ordained to the priesthood in 1950, Nonis was named Bishop of Vicenza, Italy in 1988. He retired in 2003.

References

External links and additional sources
 (for Chronology of Bishops)
 (for Chronology of Bishops)

1927 births
2014 deaths
Bishops of Vicenza